The 2006–07 season was Galatasaray's 103rd in existence and the 49th consecutive season in the Süper Lig. This article shows statistics of the club's players in the season, and also lists all matches that the club have played in the season.

Squad statistics

Players in / out

Süper Lig

Standings

Türkiye Kupası

Group stage

Quarter-final

UEFA Champions League

Third qualifying round

Group stage

Süper Kupa

Friendlies

Attendance

Notes

References

Galatasaray S.K. (football) seasons
Galatasaray S.K.
2000s in Istanbul
Galatasaray Sports Club 2006–07 season